Alessandro Fei (born 29 November 1978) is an Italian men's volleyball player, a member of Italy men's national volleyball team and Italian club Ninfa Latina. Fei was a silver and bronze medalist at the Olympic Games, World Champion 1998, European Champion (2003, 2005), silver medalist of the European Championship 2001, medalist of the World League (gold in 1999, 2000, silver in 2001, 2004, bronze in 2003), CEV Champions League winner, three-time CEV Cup winner, Challenge Cup winner, four-time Italian Champion.

He was chosen among the 2005 Italian League All-Star team. With Sisley Treviso, Fei won the 2005–06 CEV Champions League and was awarded "Most Valuable Player" and "Best Server".

Sporting achievements

Clubs

CEV Champions League
  2005/2006 - with Sisley Treviso
  2014/2015 - with Cucine Lube Civitanova

CEV Cup
  2000/2001 - with Lube Banca Macerata
  2002/2003 - with Sisley Treviso
  2010/2011 - with Sisley Treviso

Challenge Cup
  2012/2013 - with Copra Elior Piacenza

National championships
 2000/2001  Italian Cup, with Lube Banca Macerata
 2001/2002  Italian SuperCup2001, with Sisley Treviso
 2002/2003  Italian Championship, with Sisley Treviso
 2003/2004  Italian SuperCup2003, with Sisley Treviso
 2003/2004  Italian Championship, with Sisley Treviso
 2003/2004  Italian Cup, with Sisley Treviso
 2004/2005  Italian SuperCup2004, with Sisley Treviso
 2004/2005  Italian Cup, with Sisley Treviso
 2004/2005  Italian Championship, with Sisley Treviso
 2005/2006  Italian SuperCup2005, with Sisley Treviso
 2006/2007  Italian Cup, with Sisley Treviso
 2006/2007  Italian Championship, with Sisley Treviso
 2007/2008  Italian SuperCup2007, with Sisley Treviso

National team
 1998  FIVB World Championship
 1999  FIVB World League
 2000  FIVB World League
 2000  Olympic Games
 2001  FIVB World League
 2001  CEV European Championship
 2003  CEV European Championship
 2003  FIVB World League
 2004  FIVB World League
 2004  Olympic Games
 2005  CEV European Championship
 2005  FIVB World Grand Champions Cup
 2012  Olympic Games

Individual
 2004 Italian SuperCup - Most Valuable Player
 2005 Italian SuperCup - Most Valuable Player
 2005 FIVB World Grand Champions Cup - Best Spiker
 2006 CEV Champions League - Best Server
 2006 CEV Champions League - Most Valuable Player
 2014 Italian Cup - Most Valuable Player

State awards
 2000  Knight's Order of Merit of the Italian Republic
 2004  Officer's Order of Merit of the Italian Republic

References

External links

 Alessandro Fei at the International Volleyball Federation
 
 Alessandro Fei at LegaVolley Serie A
 
 
 

1978 births
Living people
Italian men's volleyball players
Olympic volleyball players of Italy
Olympic silver medalists for Italy
Olympic bronze medalists for Italy
Olympic medalists in volleyball
Volleyball players at the 2000 Summer Olympics
Volleyball players at the 2004 Summer Olympics
Volleyball players at the 2008 Summer Olympics
Volleyball players at the 2012 Summer Olympics
Medalists at the 2000 Summer Olympics
Medalists at the 2004 Summer Olympics
Medalists at the 2012 Summer Olympics
Italian Champions of men's volleyball
Sportspeople from the Province of Varese
21st-century Italian people